UAE is the United Arab Emirates.

UAE may also refer to:

Science and technology
 UAE (emulator), a software emulator for the Commodore Amiga
 Unrecoverable Application Error, a Microsoft Windows 3.0 name for a general protection fault
 Uterine artery embolization, a medical procedure that blocks blood supply to uterine fibroids

Other uses
 Emirates (airline) (ICAO designator), an Emirati airline